The 1977 FIVB Women's U20 World Championship was held in Sao Paulo, Brazil from September 5 to 14, 1977. 14 teams participated in the tournament.

Qualification
A total of 14 teams qualified for the final tournament. In addition to Brazil, who qualified automatically as the hosts, another 13 teams qualified via four separate continental tournament.

Pools composition

First round 

  and  declined to participate.

Second round

Preliminary round

Pool A

|}

|}

Pool B

|}

|}

Pool C

|}

|}

Pool D

|}

|}

Second round

Pool E (1st–8th)

|}

|}

Pool F (1st–8th)

|}

|}

Pool G (9th–16th)

|}

|}

Pool H (9th–16th)

|}

|}

Final round

13th–14th

|}

|}

9th–12th

|}

|}

5th–8th

|}

|}

1st–4th

|}

|}

Final standing

References

External links
 Informational website.

World Championship
Women's U20 Volleyball World Championship
Volleyball
FIVB Volleyball Women's U20 World Championship
1977 in youth sport